The Statute Law Revision (Northern Ireland) Act 1976 (c 12) is an Act of the Parliament of the United Kingdom.

This Act was repealed by Group 1 of Part IX of Schedule 1 to the Statute Law (Repeals) Act 1998.

See also
Statute Law Revision Act

References
The Public General Acts and General Synod Measures 1976. HMSO. London. 1977. Part I. Page 105.
HL Deb vol 366, cols 391 and 818 to 819, vol 367, col 634, vol 368, cols 1412 to 1413, vol 369, cols 11 and 990, HC Deb vol 908, cols 204 to 205 and 745 to 746.

United Kingdom Acts of Parliament 1976